The 1976 Ball State Cardinals football team was an American football team that represented Ball State University in the Mid-American Conference (MAC) during the 1976 NCAA Division I football season. In its sixth season under head coach Dave McClain, the team compiled an 8–3 record (4–1 against conference opponents) and won the school's first MAC championship. The team played its home games at Ball State Stadium in Muncie, Indiana.

The team set a school record with 2,704 rushing yards, a total that was later eclipsed by the 1987 team.

Running back Earl Taylor set the school's single-game record with 260 rushing yards against Eastern Michigan. He led the team with 1,017 rushing yards for the season. Other statistical leaders included Mike Andress with 551 receiving yards and quarterback Art Yaroch with 1,088 passing yards. Yaroch received the John Magnabosco Award as the team's most valuable player.

Five players received first-team honors on the 1976 All-MAC team: quarterback Art Yaroch; offensive guard Mitch Hoban; split end Rick Morrison; defensive back Maurice Harvey; and punter Mark O'Connell.

Art Yaroch and Mike Lecklider were the team captains.

Schedule

References

Ball State
Ball State Cardinals football seasons
Mid-American Conference football champion seasons
Ball State Cardinals football